Tripartite motif-containing protein 25 is a protein that in humans is encoded by the TRIM25 gene.

Function 

The protein encoded by this gene is a member of the tripartite motif (TRIM) family grouping more than 70 TRIMs. TRIM proteins primarily function as ubiquitin ligases that regulate the innate response to infection. TRIM25 localizes to the cytoplasm. The presence of potential DNA-binding and dimerization-transactivation domains suggests that this protein may act as a transcription factor, similar to several other members of the TRIM family. Expression of the gene is upregulated in response to estrogen, and it is thought to mediate estrogen actions in breast cancer as a primary response gene.

Domain Architecture 

TRIM25 has an N-terminal RING domain, followed by a B-box type 1 domain, a B-box type 2 domain, a coiled-coil domain (CCD) and a C-terminal SPRY domain.  The RING domain coordinates two zinc atoms and is essential for recruiting ubiquitin-conjugating enzymes. The function of the B-box domains is unknown. The CCD domain has been implicated in multimerization and other protein-protein interactions. The SPRY domain is required for substrate recruitment.  The NMR chemical shifts for backbone of the PRYSPRY domain of TRIM25 is assigned based on triple-resonance experiments using uniformly isotopic labeled protein and  the secondary structure of the domain PRYSPRY domain of TRIM25 predicted based on the NMR assignments.

TRIM25 functions 

TRIM25 plays a key role in the RIG-I signaling pathway. RIG-I is a cytosolic pattern recognition receptor that senses viral RNA. Following RNA recognition, the caspase recruitment domain (CARD) of RIG-I undergoes K(63)-linked ubiquitination by TRIM25. The RING and SPRY domains of TRIM25 mediate its interaction with RIG-I. IFN production then follows by an intracellular signaling pathway involving IRF3.

Viral escape 

To avoid IFN production, the non structural protein (NS1) of influenza will interact with CCD domain of TRIM25 to block RIG-I ubiquitination. Some studies have shown that a deletion of the CCD domain of TRIM25 prevents the binding of NS1. Without this ubiquitination, there won’t be IFN production.

References

Further reading